The 2017 NCAA Beach Volleyball Championship was the second annual tournament deciding the NCAA championship of beach volleyball, which competition is open to women only. It took place May 5-7 in Gulf Shores, Alabama, hosted by the University of Alabama at Birmingham. It was a double elimination tournament, with a single championship match. The USC Trojans won their second consecutive national title, defeating the Pepperdine Waves 3-2 in the championship match.

Qualification
The tournament is open to teams from Divisions I, II, and III. The top three teams each in the East and West Regions will qualify automatically, and two additional teams will be selected at large. Selections were announced on April 30 on NCAA.com.

Bracket

Broadcast
As in 2016, the tournament was streamed on NCAA.com and broadcast on TruTV and TBS. NCAA.com streamed matches 1-5, 9, & 13, TruTV televised matches 6-8 & 10-12, and TBS the championship match.

References

2017 in American sports
2017 in beach volleyball
2017 in women's volleyball
2017 in sports in Alabama